We Are the Tide is the second studio album from the Portland, Oregon indie group Blind Pilot.  The album was released on September 13, 2011.

Reception
Andrew Leahey of AllMusic gave the album positive review, rating it 4.5 out of 5. He judge the tracks in the album "near faultless", setting "a new benchmark in the Oregon/Washington folk-pop revival."
 
The album debuted at No. 56 on Billboard 200, No. 19 on Top Rock Albums, and No. 2 on Folk Albums, selling around 8,000 in the first week. The album has sold 65,000 copies in the United States as of July 2016.

Track listing

Personnel
 Israel Nebeker – singing, guitar, ukulele, harmonium
 Ryan Dobrowski – drums, percussion
 Luke Ydstie – bass, piano, guitar, pump organ, singing
 Kati Claborn – banjo, dulcimer, ukulele, guitar, singing
 Dave Jorgensen – trumpet, harmonium, Hammond B3, Rhodes, piano, pump organ
 Ian Krist – vibraphone
 Nathan Crockett – violin
 Joel Meredith – pedal steel

Charts

References

External links
 NPR First Listen: Blind Pilot "We Are The Tide" 

Blind Pilot albums
2011 albums